Sarkari Mehmaan is a 1979 Bollywood crime film drama directed by N. D. Kothari. The film stars Vinod Khanna and Jasmin in lead roles.

Plot
Police inspector Anand is very honest, he is known for his honesty, diligence and bravery. He single-handedly captures and arrests notorious smuggler and criminal Jack (Ranjeet), who is sentenced to several years of jail. Anand (Vinod Khanna) in disguise, also captures gangster Gul Khan (Amjad Khan), who is also sentenced to a long term in jail. Anand's wife Rekha is not very honest and trustworthy and has an affair with another man named Somesh. There are a lot of fights and arguments between husband and wife and Anand threatens to kill her. He starts following his wife hoping to catch her and Somesh red-handed. Shortly after that, Rekha and Somesh are found dead and Anand is arrested for their murder, though he has not killed them. To prove his innocence and to find the real murderers, he escapes from jail and surprisingly comes back face to face with his foes. Ultimately, he is proved innocent and the real murderer is arrested.

Cast 

Vinod Khanna as Anand
Jasmin as Bindiya
Amjad Khan as Gul Khan
Ranjeet as Jack
Om Shivpuri as King
Padma Khanna as Munni Bai
Jagdeep as Nawab Khan
Bindu as Rosy
Vikas Anand as Prosecuting Attorney
Manju Asrani as Rekha
Manmohan as Somesh
Indrani Mukherjee as Anand's Elder Sister
Shivraj as Bank Manager
Tun Tun as Bank Employee

Crew
Director - N. D. Kothari
Producer - N. D. Kothari
Music Director - Ravindra Jain
Lyrics - Hasrat Jaipuri, Naqsh Lyallapuri, Ravindra Jain
Story - Navneet
Screenplay - Navneet
Dialogue - Aziz Quaisi
Executive Producer - V. N. Kothari
Editor - I. M. Kunnu
Production Designer - Krishan Malhotra, Sampat Singh Kothari
Art Director - V. R. Karekar
Costumes Designer - Mohamed Umar
Audiographer - Raj Trehan, Zia Ul Haque
Choreographer - P. L. Raaj
Action Director - F. Makrani, Ravi Khanna
Playback Singer - Asha Bhosle
Assistant Director - Sushil Kumar
Hair Stylist - Shekar Ram Patriwal

Soundtrack

References

External links
 

1979 films
1970s Hindi-language films
1979 crime drama films
Indian crime drama films
Films scored by Ravindra Jain